Kaipa is a Swedish progressive rock band.

History 
The band was formed as Ura Kaipa by Hans Lundin (keyboards) and Tomas Eriksson (bass). Roine Stolt joined Kaipa as guitarist when he was 17. In 1974, shortly after they had cut the "Ura" from the name of the band, they released their self-titled debut album.  Stolt, who later founded The Flower Kings, left the group in 1979, after the album Solo.

In 2014, original members Roine Stolt, Ingemar Bergman, and Tomas Eriksson re-grouped under the name Kaipa DaCapo to play the old music from the first three albums as well as brand new music. New members of the band are Mikael Stolt, brother of Roine, on vocals and guitar, and renowned Swedish musician Max Lorentz on keyboards. A new album was released in 2016, followed by a live album recorded in 2017.

Members
Current
Hans Lundin – keyboards, backing vocals (1973–1982, 2000–present), lead vocals (1973–1977, 1980-1982)
Patrik Lundström – vocals (2000–present)
Aleena Gibson – vocals (2000–present)
Jonas Reingold – bass (2000–present)
Darby Todd – drums (2021–present)
Per Nilsson – guitars (2006–present)

Former
Roine Stolt – guitars, backing vocals (1974–1979, 2000–2005)
Ingemar Bergman – drums (1974–1981)
Tomas Eriksson – bass (1973–1977)
Mats Lindberg – bass (1977–1980)
Mats Löfgren – vocals (1977–1980) (d. 2016)
Max Åhman – guitars (1979–1982)
Mats "Microben" Lindberg – bass (1981–1982)
Per "Pelle" Andersson – drums (1982)
Morgan Ågren – drums (2000–2021)

Discography

Studio albums
Kaipa (1975)
Inget Nytt Under Solen (1976)
Solo (1978)
Händer (1980)
Nattdjurstid (1982)
Stockholm Symphonie (1993)
Notes from the Past (2002)
Keyholder (2003)
Mindrevolutions (2005)
Angling Feelings (2007)
In the Wake of Evolution (2010)
Vittjar (2012)
Sattyg (2014)
Children of the Sounds (2017)
Urskog (2022)

Compilations
The Decca Years 1975–1978 (2005)

See also
The Flower Kings

References

External links
Kaipa: Notes From the Past (official website)
2010 interview with Hans Lundin on Prog Sphere
2013 Interview with Hans Lundin on Lebmetal
Swedish progressive rock group KAIPA returns with their 14th studio album “Urskog” and a new drummer

Swedish progressive rock groups
Symphonic rock groups
Inside Out Music artists
Musea artists